There have been four baronetcies created for persons with the surname Montgomery, one in the Baronetage of Nova Scotia, one in the Baronetage of Great Britain and two in the Baronetage of the United Kingdom. One creation is extant as of 2011.

The Montgomery baronetcy, of Skelmorly, was created in the Baronetage of Nova Scotia in January 1628 for Robert Montgomery. The sixth Baronet was one of the original Scottish representatives to the 1st Parliament of Great Britain. The title became dormant on his death in 1735.

The Montgomery baronetcy, of Magbie Hill in the County of Peebles, was created in the Baronetage of Great Britain on 28 May 1774 for William Montgomery. The second Baronet represented Peeblesshire in Parliament. The title became extinct on his death in 1831.

The Montgomery baronetcy, of Stanhope in the County of Peebles, was created in the Baronetage of the United Kingdom on 16 July 1801 for the Scottish lawyer and politician James Montgomery. The second Baronet represented Peeblesshire in Parliament. The third Baronet represented both Peebles and Peebles and Selkirk in Parliament. He assumed the additional surname of Graham. The seventh Baronet was Lord-Lieutenant of Kinross-shire. He assumed the surname of Purvis-Russell-Montgomery in 1906 and Purvis-Russell-Hamilton-Montgomery in 1933. The eighth and ninth Baronet have used the surname Montgomery only. The ninth Baronet was Lord-Lieutenant of Perth and Kinross.
 
The Montgomery baronetcy, of The Hall in the County of Donegal, was created in the Baronetage of the United Kingdom on 3 October 1808 for Conyngham Montgomery, Member of Parliament for Mitchell, Donegal and Yarmouth. The second Baronet was sworn of the Privy Council in 1876. The title became extinct on the death of the fifth Baronet in 1939.

Montgomery baronets, of Skelmorly (1628)
Sir Robert Montgomery, 1st Baronet (died 1651) 
Sir Robert Montgomery, 2nd Baronet (died 1654)  
Sir Robert Montgomery, 3rd Baronet (died 1684)  
Sir James Montgomery, 4th Baronet (died 1694)  
Sir Robert Montgomery, 5th Baronet (died 1731)  
Sir Hugh Montgomery, 6th Baronet (–1735)

Montgomery baronets, of Magbie Hill (1774)
Sir William Montgomery, 1st Baronet (1717–1788) 
Sir George Montgomery, 2nd Baronet (1765–1831)

Montgomery, later Graham-Montgomery, later Purvis-Russell-Montgomery, later Montgomery baronets, of Stanhope (1801)
Sir James Montgomery, 1st Baronet (1721–1803) 
Sir James Montgomery, 2nd Baronet (1766–1839) 
Sir Graham Graham-Montgomery, 3rd Baronet (1823–1901) 
Sir James Graham-Montgomery, 4th Baronet (1850–1902) 
Sir Basil Templer Graham-Montgomery, 5th Baronet (1852–1928) 
The Reverend Sir Charles Percy Graham-Montgomery, 6th Baronet (6 September 1855 – 1 April 1930). 
Sir Henry James Purvis-Russell-Hamilton-Montgomery, 7th Baronet (1859–1947)    
Sir Basil Purvis-Russell-Montgomery, 8th Baronet (1884–1964)
Lt.-Col. Henry Keith Purvis-Russell-Montgomery (1896–1954), 2nd and youngest son of the 7th Baronet 
Sir Basil Henry David Montgomery, 9th Baronet (born 1931), only son of Lt.-Col. Henry Purvis-Russell-Montgomery
 
The heir apparent to the baronetcy is James David Keith Montgomery (born 1957), eldest son of the 9th Baronet.

The heir apparent to the heir apparent is his only son, Edward Henry James Montgomery (born 1986).

Montgomery baronets, of The Hall (1808)
Sir (Henry) Conyngham Montgomery, 1st Baronet (1765–1830)
Sir Henry Conyngham Montgomery, 2nd Baronet (1803–1878)
Admiral Sir Alexander Leslie Montgomery, 3rd Baronet (1807–1888) 
Sir Hugh Conyngham Gaston Montgomery, 4th Baronet (1847–1915) 
Sir Alexander Cecil Montgomery, 5th Baronet (1859–1939)

See also
Montgomery-Cuninghame baronets

References

Baronetcies in the Baronetage of the United Kingdom
Dormant baronetcies in the Baronetage of Nova Scotia
Extinct baronetcies in the Baronetage of Great Britain
Extinct baronetcies in the Baronetage of the United Kingdom